Cham Quleh (also Romanized as Cham Qūleh) is a village in Shabab Rural District, in Shabab District of Chardavol County, Ilam Province, Iran. At the 2006 census, its population was 287, in 58 families. The village is populated by Kurds.

References 

Populated places in Chardavol County
Kurdish settlements in Ilam Province